Runhall is a village and former civil parish, now in the parish of Brandon Parva, Coston, Runhall and Welborne, in the South Norfolk district, in Norfolk, England.

The villages name origin is uncertain possibly, 'tree-trunk nook of land', 'Runa's nook of land', or perhaps, 'council's nook of land'.

Its church, All Saints, is one of 124 existing round-tower churches in Norfolk.

Civil parish 
On 1 April 1935 the parishes of Brandon Parva, Coston and Welborne were merged with Runhall, on 28 January 2013 the merged parish was renamed "Brandon Parva, Coston, Runhall and Welborne". In 1931 the parish of Runhall (prior to the merge) had a population of 169.

Notes 

http://kepn.nottingham.ac.uk/map/place/Norfolk/Runhall

External links

All Saints on the European Round Tower Churches website

Villages in Norfolk
Former civil parishes in Norfolk
South Norfolk